Diabolus in Musica (founded Paris, 1992) is a French medieval music ensemble based in Tours and directed by Antoine Guerber. Guerber studied medieval music under Dominique Vellard at the Centre de Musique Médiévale de Paris and at the Early Music Department of the Conservatoire National Supérieur in Lyon.

Discography
1992 - Musique en Aquitaine. Musique en Aquitaine au temps d'Aliénor (XIIe s.). Plein Jeu DMP 9105 C.
1994 - La Chambre des Dames. Chansons et polyphonies de trouvères (XIIe & XIIIe siècles). Studio SM D2604
1997 - Manuscrit de Tours. Chants de fête du XIIIe siècle. Studio SM D2672
1998 - Vox Sonora. Conduits de l'École de Notre-Dame. Studio SM D2673
1999 - La chanson de Guillaume. Lai, chansons guerrières et politiques 1188–1250. Studio SM D2756
1999 - Missa Magna. Messe à la chapelle papale d'Avignon, XIVe siècle. Studio SM D2819
2000 - Rosarius. Chants religieux en langue d'oïl (XIIIe et XIVe siècles). Studio SM D2886
2002 - Honi soit qui mal y pense!. Polyphonies des chapelles royales anglaises (1328-1410). Alpha 022
2003 - Carmina Gallica. Chansons latines du XIIe siècle. Alpha 037
2004 - Missa Se la face ay pale, Guillaume Dufay. Alpha 051
2005 - La Douce Acordance. Chansons de trouvères des XIIe et XIIIe siècles. Alpha 085
2006 - Paris expers Paris. École de Notre-Dame, 1170–1240. Alpha 102
2007 - Guillaume Du Fay: Mille Bonjours !. Alpha 116
2008 - La Messe de Nostre Dame, Guillaume de Machaut. Messe du XIVe siècle. Alpha 132
2010 - Rose tres bele. Chansons et polyphonies des dames Trouvères (XIIe et XIIIe siècles). Alpha 156
2011 - Historia Sancti Martini. Office de la Saint-Martin d’hiver (XIIIe siècle). Aeon  1103
2011 - Johannes Ciconia Opera Sacra 1 CD of 2CD box. Ricercar 316
2012 - Plorer, Gemir, Crier... Hommage à la Voix d'Or de Johannes Ockeghem. Aeon 1226
2014 - Sanctus! Les saints dans la polyphonie parisienne au XIIIe siècle. Bayard Musique 308 422
2015 - Œuvres sacrées de Jean Mouton. Bayard Musique 308 437
2018 - Requiem, Johannes Ockeghem, Pierre de La Rue. Bayard Musique 308 475.2
2021 - Reine du Ciel, Missa Ave Regina Celorum, Guillaume Dufay. Bayard Musique 308 611

References

Early music groups